The 2012–13 Saudi Crown Prince Cup was the 38th season of the Saudi Crown Prince Cup since its establishment in 1957. This season's competition featured a total of 16 teams, 14 teams from the Pro League, and 2 teams from the qualifying rounds.

The 2013 Crown Prince Cup Final was played between Al-Hilal and Al-Nassr at the King Fahd International Stadium in Riyadh. Al-Hilal defeated Al-Nassr 4–2 on penalties (1–1 after extra time) in the final to win a record-extending twelfth Crown Prince Cup title and their sixth one in a row.

Qualifying rounds
All of the competing teams that are not members of the Pro League competed in the qualifying rounds to secure one of 2 available places in the Round of 16. First Division sides Al-Qadisiyah and Al-Orobah qualified.

Preliminary round 1
The Preliminary Round 1 matches were played on 16 September 2012.

Preliminary round 2
The Preliminary Round 2 matches were played on 19, 20 & 21 September 2012.

First round
The First Round matches were played on 3 & 4 October 2012.

Second round
The Second Round matches were played on 14 & 21 October 2012.

Third round
The Third Round matches were played on 4 November and 2 December 2012.

Final round
The Final Round matches were played on 18 November and 10 December 2012.

Bracket

Note:     H: Home team, A: Away team

Round of 16
The Round of 16 fixtures were played on 18 & 19 December 2012. All times are local, AST (UTC+3).

Quarter-finals
The quarter-finals fixtures were played on 22 & 23 December 2012. All times are local, AST (UTC+3).

Semi-finals
The semi-finals fixtures were played on 9 February 2013. All times are local, AST (UTC+3).

Final

The final was held on 22 February 2013 in the King Fahd International Stadium in Riyadh. All times are local, AST (UTC+3).

Top goalscorers
Updated 22 February 2013

References

Saudi Crown Prince Cup seasons
2012–13 domestic association football cups
Crown Prince Cup